Sally Crute (born Sally C. Kirby, June 27, 1886 – August 12, 1971) was an American actress of the silent film era.

Biography
Born in Chattanooga, Tennessee, before entering motion pictures Crute performed on stage. Crute was generally cast as a widow or man charmer in movies. She was employed by Edison Studios. She was a leading woman of Harold Lockwood, Joseph Burks, and Frank Lyon, among others.

In In Spite of All (1915) she played the role of Stella, a famous dancer who lures the film's hero. In Her Vocation (1915), she appeared as an adventurous newspaper woman in a cast which included Augustus Phillips. As Lucille Stanton, in When Men Betray (1918), Crute performs as a female so enticing she makes men her willing slaves.

After leaving motion pictures in 1925, Crute returned to make The Ace of Cads in 1926. The film starred Adolphe Menjou. She also appeared in Tin Gods (1926) with Thomas Meighan.

Crute died in 1971 in Miami, Florida.

Partial filmography

 The House of the Lost Court (1915) - Nina Desmond
 The Light at Dusk (1916)
 The Cossack Whip (1916)
 Blue Jeans (1917) - Sue Eudaly
 The Law of Compensation (1917)
 The Beautiful Lie (1917)
 The Avenging Trail (1917)
 The Awakening of Ruth (1917)
 A Wife by Proxy (1917)
 The Tell-Tale Step (1917)
 The Law of the North (1917)
 The Power of Decision (1917)
 The Belgian (1918) - Countess de Vries
 When Men Betray (1918) - Lucille Stanton
 Opportunity (1918)
 Eye for Eye (1918) - Helene
 The Poor Rich Man (1918)
 Atonement (1919)
 A Broadway Saint (1919)
 The Undercurrent (1919)
 The Greatest Love (1920)
 Even as Eve (1920) - Agatha Sproul
 The Garter Girl (1920) - Lynette
 Blind Wives (1920) - Business Woman
 Miss 139 (1921) - Vera Cardine
 It Isn't Being Done This Season (1921) 
 The Tents of Allah (1923)
 Broadway Broke (1923)
 His Children's Children (1923) - Mrs. Wingate
 Week End Husbands (1924)
 A Little Girl in a Big City (1925)
 The Half-Way Girl (1925) - Effie
 Ermine and Rhinestones (1925) - Alys Ferring
 Tin Gods (1926)
 The Ace of Cads (1926)

References

Annapolis, Maryland Capitol, At The Republic Tomorrow, September 17, 1918, Page 3.
Bridgeport Telegram, News of Interest to Women, Tuesday, September 10, 1918, Page 11.
Fort Wayne Gazette, Her Vocation Special Edison Feature At Lyric, August 3, 1915, Page 10.
Lima, Ohio Daily News, Movielettes, March 3, 1915, Page 15.
Syracuse Post-Standard, Amusements, Thursday Evening, July 29, 1926, Page 24.

External links

American stage actresses
American film actresses
American silent film actresses
Actresses from Tennessee
1886 births
1971 deaths
People from Chattanooga, Tennessee
20th-century American actresses